Joint investigation teams (JIT) are law enforcement and judicial teams set up jointly by EU national investigative agencies to handle cross-border crime. Joint investigation teams coordinate the investigations and prosecutions conducted in parallel by several countries.

Description 
A Joint Investigation Team (JIT) is formed based upon an agreement between competent authorities – both judicial (judges, prosecutors, investigative judges) and law enforcement – of two or more member states of the European Union (EU). They can be backed up by Eurojust and Europol, the EU judicial and law enforcement agencies. Their terms of operation are based on Europol's Model Agreement for Setting up a Joint Investigation Team, as appended to Council of Europe Resolution 2017/C 18/01.

History 
After the shootdown of Malaysia Airlines Flight 17 in July 2014, a joint investigation team conducting criminal investigation with representatives from Australia, Belgium, Malaysia, the Netherlands and Ukraine was formed.

A JIT was formed in April 2020 by the French National Gendarmerie and the Dutch police to investigate the secure communication service EncroChat, used by some 60,000 subscribers at the time of its closure; nearly all of them were criminals.

References

External links 

Criminal investigation
International criminal law
Teams
Collaboration
Malaysia Airlines Flight 17